"That's the Way of the World" is a 1990 song by British dance producer D Mob featuring singer Cathy Dennis. It went to number-one on the US dance charts for one week and was the second number-one single for D Mob in which Cathy Dennis performed the vocals, and the fourth and final release to reach number-one for D Mob. The accompanying music video was directed by British director Howard Greenhalgh.

Critical reception
Alex Henderson from AllMusic stated that "the more melodic and accessible nature of "deep house" is evident" on the song, adding it as a "very addictive" club hit that feature "likeable dance diva" Cathy Dennis. Bill Coleman from Billboard wrote, "Rack up another No. 1 for the D. Tasty new mixes of the infectious pop/dance nugget are sure to make this a programming staple." Ernest Hardy from Cashbox commented, "This was immediately one of my favorite cuts off the album, A Little Bit of This, A Little Bit of That. Lyrically, it's one of the more cynical efforts out right now (“Nothing matters 'til you make it... nothing matters in the end”) and though it has that D-Mob sound, it also manages to lean more toward club than pop. Cathy Dennis' performance is both detatched [sic] and aching." David Giles from Music Week described it as "a fairy standard Brit-house track." He added, "You're familiar with the formula by now I'm sure—stuttering piano, a beat that fades into the background after a while like a ticking clock, and throwaway bluesy soul female vocals."

Track listings
UK CD single
"That's the Way of the World" (7")
"That's the Way of the World" (Essential Beat Mix)
"That's the Way of the World" (Instrumental Version)
"That's the Way of the World" (Accapella Version)

Charts

References

1990 singles
D Mob songs
Cathy Dennis songs
Songs written by Cathy Dennis
FFRR Records singles
1989 songs
Songs written by D Mob
Music videos directed by Howard Greenhalgh